A network monitoring interface card or NMIC is similar to a network card (NIC). However, unlike a standard network card, an NMIC is designed to passively (and silently) listen on a network. At a functional level, an NMIC may differ from a NIC, in that the NMIC may not have a MAC address, may lack the ability to transmit and may not announce its presence on a network. Advanced NMICs have features that include an ability to offload CPU intensive processing from a system's CPU, accurate time measurement, traffic filtering, and an ability to perform other application specific processing.

Organizations often use a dedicated interface for all management traffic and thus create a management network. This is done to minimize the impact on production traffic, ensure the integrity of management traffic and it helps by measuring true production traffic not the traffic generated to the act of measuring traffic. This is a separate function from NMICs that are used for data collection and processing.

NMICs are typically used in intrusion detection and prevention (IDS/IPS), lawful interception, flow analysis, network monitoring, and protocol analyzer systems.

Notable manufacturers include  Endace,  SolarFLare and Intel.

See also

 Egress filtering
 Flow analysis
 Ingress filtering
 Intrusion-detection system (IDS)
 Lawful interception
 Network monitoring
 Network tap
 Packet analyzer
 SS7 probe
 TCP Offload Engine (TOE)
 TCP segmentation offloading 
 Unified Threat Management (UTM)

Networking hardware